Peter Vasper (born 3 September 1945) is an English former footballer who played in the Football League for Cambridge United and Norwich City.

External links
 

English footballers
English Football League players
Guildford City F.C. players
Norwich City F.C. players
Cambridge United F.C. players
Dartford F.C. players
1945 births
Living people
Association football goalkeepers